Barry Young (né Clarence LaVonne Fitzgerald; June 27, 1931 in Oklahoma – December 2, 1966 in Los Angeles) was an American pop singer who recorded for Dot Records in the 1960s. His biggest hit single was a recording of the tune "One Has My Name (The Other Has My Heart)," which had previously been a number 1 hit on the country charts for Jimmy Wakely in 1948. The song hit number 13 on the Billboard Hot 100 early in 1966. He also released an album on Dot, entitled One Has My Name, which peaked at number 67 on the Billboard 200 that same year.

Barry Young died of a brain abscess on December 2, 1966. He was 35 years old.

References

1933 births
1966 deaths
20th-century American singers
20th-century American male singers
American male pop singers
Dot Records artists